15 Minutes of War is a 2019 French-Belgian war film directed by Fred Grivois. It is freely based on real events known at the Prise d'otages de Loyada.

Plot
In February 1976 in Djibouti, a school bus was taken hostage at the Somali border. The GIGN is sent on the spot, where after 30 hours of tension a rescue operation is organized.

Cast
 Alban Lenoir as André Gerval
 Olga Kurylenko as Jane Andersen
  as Pierre Cazeneuve
 David Murgia as Patrice Lorca
 Michaël Abiteboul as Georges Campère
 Guillaume Labbé as Jean-Luc Larrain
 Ben Cura as Phillip Shafer
 Vincent Perez as Général Favrart
 Josiane Balasko as Michèle Sampieri
 Kevin Layne as Barkhad
 Moumouni Seydou Almoctar as Mahat

Production
Principal photography on the film was conducted during the summer of 2017.

References

External links
 
 

2010s war drama films
2019 action drama films
2019 films
French films based on actual events
Films set in 1976
Films set in Djibouti
Films shot in Morocco
French action drama films
French war drama films
GIGN
2010s French-language films
Belgian war drama films
Belgian action films
2010s French films